Edivaldo Sarafim da Silva Junior (born April 15, 1974) is a retired Brazilian association football player.  Using the name Juninho da Silva,  played professionally in Brazil, Bolivia, Mexico, Tunisia, Puerto Rico and the United States.

Juninho da Silva started his career at the base of EC Vitoria of Bahia, Brazil in 1989. In 1992 he moved to play for CR Flamengo in Rio de Janeiro, Brazil. Da Silva accumulates several brazilian clubs and abroad in his career among them Independiente Petrolero Sucre in Bolivia, CAB, Tunisia. After spend the season with EC Novo Hamburgo in Brazil, he signed with the Puerto Rico Islanders of the USL First Division in 2004, the Rochester Rhinos of USL-1 in 2005 and 2006. In the summer of 2008, Junhinho signed with Guaynabo Fluminense FC of the new Puerto Rico Soccer League. Then, in 2009, he signed with Club Atletico River Plate Ponce, also from the Puerto Rico Soccer League. Juninho lives in Ottawa, Canada and is coordinator of coaches at the Barcelona Academy franchise.

References

External links
Juninho’s USL-1 player profile
 Remember that pick Juninho?, Way Back in 96?

Brazilian footballers
Brazilian expatriate footballers
USL First Division players
Puerto Rico Islanders players
Rochester New York FC players
Brazilian expatriate sportspeople in Puerto Rico
Living people
Puerto Rico United players
USL Championship players
1974 births
A-League (1995–2004) players
New York Red Bulls draft picks
Association footballers not categorized by position